The concentration camp memorial site Hailfingen-Tailfingen is a joint project of two communities and districts: The Rottenburger district Hailfingen in the Tübingen region and the Gäufeldener district Tailfingen in the Böblingen Region.

History 
For parts of the population, the memory of what happened in certain locations in the last years of the war had something traumatic about it. People knew about the concentration camp Hailfingen-Tailfingen and about the events that happened there. However, the population and local politicians refused to create a place of remembrance. A temporary memorial stone was desecrated in 1985. It was not until the mid-1990s that a change in consciousness began. By 2010, all the necessary conditions had been met and ideas had been specified so that a multi-part concentration camp memorial could be erected.

Memorial 
At the western end of the former military airfield, the community of Hailfingen erected a memorial to the Jewish victims in May 2010, which was inaugurated on 6 June 2010. The sculptor Rudolf Kurz created a 2.5 m high and 5 m wide uneven triangle at the base line from closely grouted aluminium bars, so that a closed surface is created. This triangle stands in front of a 5 m long and 2 m high wall of untreated fair-faced concrete, at a close distance and offset laterally. The names of all the 601 concentration camp prisoners, survivors and perished, are engraved. The renunciation of an alphabetical order or by country of origin, forces viewers to go slowly when reading.

Exhibition and documentation centre in Tailfinger Town Hall 

Above all, the private initiatives and extensive research by Volker Mall and Harald Roth were the impetus for the establishment of a multimedia exhibition space on the ground floor of the Tailfinger Town Hall. The target groups are primarily school classes with pupils aged 14 and over. In addition to modern touch-screen monitors, a room-long chronological table over two metres high has been created, from which the connections can be understood. An aerial panorama of the airfield and its surroundings was taken from several aerial photographs taken in 1944/1945. The "Number Book" lists the names of all Jewish prisoners. However, the focus is on the individual fates of the camp inmates and the testimonies of contemporary witnesses from the Gäu region. The entire stock of digital documents can be used for research purposes. The entire exhibition site has been deliberately designed for possible extensions. At the end of 2008 a documentary film was made: "Das KZ-Außenlager Hailfingen/Tailfingen" by Bernhard Koch in cooperation with Gegen Vergessen - Für Demokratie.

Cemetery in Tailfingen 

On 2 June 1945, the dead of the mass grave were recovered from the concentration camp and buried in the Tailfinger cemetery. The following was engraved on a wooden cross: "72 unknown concentration camp prisoners rest here“. In the 1960s, the sons of Ignac Klein erected a gravestone. In 1986, commemorative plaques were erected at the Tailfinger cemetery from the community and the Jewish religious community of Württemberg at a memorial service for the victims of the camp. As part of the memorial, a plaque with the names of the buried was erected in 2010.

Memorial path, Reusten quarry 
A memorial path is set up. It also includes the former quarry at Reusten, where many of the prisoners had to go to forced labor every day. One of the tipping wagons in use at the time was set up as a Memento.

Memorial site associations 
The memorial is a member of the Gäu-Neckar-Alb Memorials Network and the Natzweiler Memorials Network in the former concentration camp complex.

References 

Monuments and memorials to the victims of Nazism
History of Württemberg